Smoker is a surname. Notable people with the surname include:

 Barbara Smoker (1923–2020), British Humanist activist and freethought advocate
 Craig Smoker (born 1978), Australian rules footballer 
 George Smoker (1856–1925), English cricketer and footballer
 Henry Smoker (1881–1966), English cricketer and footballer, son of George Smoker
 Jeff Smoker (born 1981), American football quarterback
 Josh Smoker (born 1988), American baseballer 
 Paul Smoker (1941–2016), American jazz trumpeter